The 2004 Arkansas State Indians football team represented Arkansas State University as a member of the Sun Belt Conference the 2004 NCAA Division I-A football season. Led by third-year head coach Steve Roberts, the Indians compiled an overall record of 3–8 with a mark of 3–4 in conference play, placing sixth in the Sun Belt.

Schedule

References

Arkansas State
Arkansas State Red Wolves football seasons
Arkansas State Indians football